Air Charter International was a French charter airline that operated from 1966 to 1998.

History

Early operations

Air Charter was established on 7 February 1966 as a subsidiary of Air France under the name Societé aérienne française d'affrètements (SAFA). Flight operations began on 25 July 1966 with two Sud Caravelles and two Lockheed Super Constellations. These flew charter flights from Paris to the Mediterranean.

Later years

The airline changed its name on 8 December 1969 to Air Charter International (ACI). In 1971, ACI operated a fleet of seven Caravelles and carried about 420.000 passengers. The first two Boeing 727-200 were introduced in 1972. Transatlantic charter flights to the USA and Canada were offered from 1982 onwards with leased Boeing 747-200 aircraft operated by Air France. Six Super Caravelles were leased from EAS Europe Airlines until 1992.

In 1984, the airline's name was shortened to Air Charter. As the business grew, the first wide-body aircraft was introduced in 1988, the Airbus A300B4. Two Boeing 737-200 from EAS Europe Aéro Service on 1988. By the mid-1990s, the 727s were replaced by the Airbus A320. With the merger of Air France and Air Inter in 1998, Air Charter had served its purpose and services were discontinued on 24 October 1998.

Fleet

Air Charter operated the following aircraft:

Accidents and incidents
On 26 June 1988, an Airbus A320-100 operated for Air France as Air France Flight 296Q crashed into a forest while performing a low pass over the Habsheim Air Show.

References

External links

Defunct airlines of France
Airlines established in 1966
Airlines disestablished in 1998
Defunct charter airlines
Air France–KLM
French companies established in 1966
French companies disestablished in 1998